Sai Kung Country Park, a country park on the Sai Kung Peninsula in northeast Hong Kong, comprises:
 Sai Kung East Country Park
 Sai Kung West Country Park
 Sai Kung West Country Park (Wan Tsai Extension)

Parks in Hong Kong